The history of commercial passenger shipping on the Great Lakes is long but uneven. It reached its zenith between the mid-19th century and the 1950s. As early as 1844, palace steamers carried passengers and cargo around the Great Lakes. By 1900, fleets of relatively luxurious passenger steamers plied the waters of the lower lakes, especially the major industrial centres of Chicago, Milwaukee, Detroit, Cleveland, Buffalo, and Toronto.

History
 
The first steamboat on the Great Lakes depends on definition. The U.S.-built Ontario, launched in the spring of 1817 at Sacketts Harbor, New York, began its regular service in April 1817 before Frontenac made its first trip to the head of the lake on June 5.

The first steamboat on the upper Great Lakes was the passenger-carrying , built in 1818 to navigate Lake Erie. It was a success and more vessels like it followed. Steamboats on the lakes grew in size and number, and additional decks were built on the superstructure to allow more capacity. This inexpensive method of adding capacity was adapted from river steamboats and successfully applied to lake-going craft.

The Erie Canal opened in 1825, allowing settlers from New England and New York to reach Michigan by water through Albany and Buffalo. This route opening and the incorporation of Chicago, Illinois in 1837, increased Great Lakes steamboat traffic from Detroit through the Straits of Mackinac to Chicago. 

The screw propeller was introduced to the Great Lakes by Vandalia in 1842 and allowed the building of a new class of combination passenger and freight carrier. The first of these "package and passenger freighters", Hercules, was built in Buffalo in 1843. Hercules displayed all the features that defined the type, a screw propelled the vessel, passengers were accommodated in staterooms on the upper deck, and package freight below on the large main deck and in the holds.
 
Engines developed as well. Compound engines, in which steam was expanded twice for greater efficiency, were first used on the Great Lakes in 1869. Triple-expansion engines, for even greater efficiency, were introduced in 1887 and quadruple-expansion engines, the ultimate type of reciprocating engine for speed, power and efficiency, appeared on the lakes in 1894.

Steamboat lines were established by railroads on the Great lakes to join railheads in the 1850s. This service carried goods and passengers from railroads in the East across the length of the lakes to railroads for the journey West. Railroads bought and built steamship lines to complement railroad services. One such railroad-owned steamship line was formed by the Pennsylvania Railroad in 1865 to connect their terminals at Buffalo to those of the Northern Pacific Railroad at Duluth, Minnesota. This new line, owned by the Erie and Western Transportation Co., became the well-known Anchor Line. The Northern Pacific started its own Northern Steamship Company which, from the mid-1890s, operated the steamers, North Land and North West on 7-day round trip cruises between Buffalo to Duluth. Travelers could disembark at several points and were allowed to finish their voyage later in the season.

A significant industry in leisure cruising arose beginning in the late 19th century, providing large passenger vessels for travel to summer resorts and hotels in the north woods, away from the polluted cities. Summer hotels such as the Grand Hotel on Mackinac Island and Ottawa Beach near Holland, Michigan as well as cottage resorts like Harbor Beach and Petoskey, Michigan had regular steamship service. The passenger steamers were also used as charters for day trips. While the ship had been known as the "Queen of the Great Lakes" it is now also a symbol of the end of passenger cruises on the Great Lakes. SS North American and SS South American would continue to sail until 1967 when South American made a final run delivering passengers to the 1967 World's Fair in Montreal, Quebec.

In 1915, the anti-monopoly provisions of section 11 of the Panama Canal Act of 1912, ch. 390, 37 Stat. 560, 566 (August 24, 1912), which prohibited railroads under most circumstances from owning steamships, went into effect. As a result, railroad-owned company fleets were sold to buyers with no ownership interest in railways because under the new law railroads had to divest themselves of their marine divisions on the lakes.  Under this divestiture law, for instance, was sold by the Anchor Line along with four other railroad-owned company fleets to the newly formed Great Lakes Transit Corporation. Under this flag, Milwaukee Clipper carried passengers along her old route until retired in 1970.

Resort traffic

 

Before trains and, later, cars became prevalent, summer vacation areas in more remote areas around the Great Lakes were accessible primarily only by steamer. Northern Michigan's tourist and resort areas began to grow in this manner in the late 1890s.

In the late 19th century, many early tourists arrived at Northern Michigan resort areas via a Lake Michigan steamship. Chicago to Harbor Springs, Michigan, was a popular trip for many passengers. Manitou would make the trip in 24 hours. In 1898, the fare was $5.00, with meals and berth extra. Two other popular ships were Petoskey and Charlevoix; their time to Harbor Springs was 40 hours. The cost to take these boats in 1898 was $7.00, with meals and berth included. Early steamships stopped at Harbor Springs due to its naturally protected and very deep harbor; later, they added a stop in Petoskey.

During the period between 1910 and 1931, crowds would gather at the Glen Haven docks on Saturdays and Sundays. Motorcoaches awaited newly arriving resort guests while many summer home residents rode to the docks to meet husbands or fathers arriving from the Chicago area. "They leave Chicago Friday night," explained a tourist publication, "and get here the next morning; first stop. They're with their families until Sunday night when the boat takes 'em back again, ready for the job. Great for 'em!"

The author Ernest Hemingway spent the majority of his first 22 summers in Northern Michigan, around Petoskey. He often traveled by steamer from Chicago to Harbor Springs, a voyage that would take 32 hours.

Major lines on the Great Lakes included the Detroit and Cleveland Navigation Company in the U.S., and in Canada, the Northern Navigation Company (later absorbed by Canada Steamship Lines). Some were affiliated with railway companies such as the Ann Arbor Railroad, the Grand Trunk Railway, and the Pere Marquette Railway (absorbed in 1947 into the Chesapeake and Ohio Railway). On Georgian Bay and Lake Huron, the ships of the Owen Sound Transportation Company Limited have shuttled passengers since 1921.

Current service

Since the 1950s, leisure cruises have given way to ferry services on the Great Lakes, transporting people and vehicles to and from various islands. These include Isle Royale, Pelée Island, Mackinac Island, Beaver Island, Bois Blanc Island (Michigan), Bois Blanc Island (Ontario), Kelleys Island, South Bass Island, North Manitou Island, South Manitou Island, Harsens Island, the Toronto Islands. Well-known among these is  linking Tobermory (Ontario) with the largest freshwater island in the world, Manitoulin Island.

An international ferry ran on Lake Ontario from Rochester, New York to Toronto from 2004 to 2005, but it was plagued with high operating costs and low demand. The privately-owned company was taken over by the city administration of Rochester, and the ship was sold overseas where it operated across the Strait of Gibraltar.

Cruise ship traffic on the Great Lakes increased in the early-21st century, with ships like ,  and the smaller ships of the Great Lakes Cruise Company offering multi-day trips.

Some passenger steamers

See also
Ferries in Michigan
Lake steamers of North America

References

External links 
 Great Lakes Transit Corporation cruise brochures, 1925 and 1935
 Carferries of the Great Lakes
 Noronic disaster (Library and Archives Canada)
 Marine Historical Society of Detroit: Passenger Ships of the Great Lakes 

Passenger ships of the Great Lakes
Passenger ships of the United States
Steamboats by body of water